The fifth season of Ang Probinsyano, a Philippine action drama television series, premiered on March 15, 2018, on ABS-CBN's Primetime Bida evening block and worldwide on The Filipino Channel and concluded on September 21, 2018, with a total of 135 episodes. The series stars Coco Martin as SPO2 Ricardo Dalisay, together with an ensemble cast.

The fifth season of Ang Probinsyano chronicles Cardo and Vendetta's struggle against corruption in the larger Philippine political arena. Vendetta not only has to fight the Renato Hipolito-backed terrorist group Kamandag, they are also up against a gun-running ring operated by the Vice President of the Philippines, Lucas Cabrera.

Hipolito and Cabrera, beyond being from the same political party, have joined forces to combat Vendetta and to secure for Hipolito the top spot in the midterm senatorial elections. Hipolito intends to use the top senatorial spot to catapult him to the presidency in the next presidential elections. Cabrera, on the other hand, wants the Senate to be dominated by his partymates, with Hipolito leading the charge as Senate President, in order to ensure that Cabrera will win the presidency in the next national elections unaware of Hipolito's intent to double-cross him to secure the presidency for himself.

Plot 
Marco (J. C. Santos) formally introduces Alyana (Yassi Pressman) to the rest of the Cabrera Family. Marco's half-brother, Congressman Brandon Cabrera (Mark Anthony Fernandez) is supportive of the pair's relationship. On the other hand, the Vice President of the Philippines, Lucas Cabrera (Edu Manzano), is concerned about how his son's relationship with Alyana will adversely affect his bid for the Presidency in the next election. His spouse, Second Lady Catherine Cabrera (Alice Dixson), feigns acceptance of Alyana, if only to stop Marco from throwing a fit. Cardo (Coco Martin) continues to woo Alyana, but is finally rebuked when Alyana returns her wedding ring to Cardo.

General Olegario (Angel Aquino) sought the help of General Borja (Jaime Fàbregas), despite the objections of Romulo (Lito Lapid), Ramil (Michael de Mesa) and Cardo. Unbeknownst to General Olegario, her secretary, James (Jay Gonzaga), was tailed by Major Catindig (Sid Lucero). Catindig then informs Director Hipolito (John Arcilla), who in turn, orders Alakdan (Jhong Hilario) to perform a hit on Vendetta. Vendetta survived the attack on their hideout but at the cost of both Kalabaw (Rey Solo) and Jimboy (Jayson Gainza) who sacrificed themselves to make their escape. During the attack, Director Hipolito arrived to personally take down Romulo, seeing an opportunity to raise his profile again. However, Romulo survives his wounds and is immediately brought by the CIDG in a hospital where he laid in critical condition. However, Hipolito manages to wrest control of the supervision of Romulo from CIDG and Vendetta must race against time in order to extract Romulo from the clutches of Director Hipolito. Meanwhile, when Alyana decided to visit Lola Flora and her family, Marco is against her decisions thinking she was going to Cardo's family causing the two to have an argument which resulted Alyana to leave but is unaware of Marco's violent behavior.

When Cardo poses as a doctor to rescue Romulo at the hospital due to being guarded by Hipolito's security, he meets Andrea "Andy" B. Collins (Jessy Mendiola) a nurse who also working at the hospital. Failing to rescue Romulo at their first rescue attempt, Andy's brother Stephen "Peng" Balaraw (Nicco Manalo) finally informs her about what happened to their mother much to her horrible shock. Vendetta successfully rescued Andy's mother Rebecca "Becky" Balaraw (Minnie Aguilar) and other hostesses being involved in human trafficking headed by Mr. Gibson (Andy Lunz) at their yacht as Blossom (Katya Santos) one of the hostesses was raped by one of the foreigners for their enjoyment. In the meantime, Marco forces Alyana to marry him against her will despite his father and his older brother's disapprovement and threatens her he will commit suicide while showing his violent behavior towards her and leave. Since Alyana didn't answer all of Marco's calls, his car accidentally crashed on the truck, nearly killing him. After rescuing Becky and the other hostesses named Blossom, Marigold (Jaycee Parker), Hasmin (Gwen Garci), Rose (Maui Taylor) and Dalia (Zara Lopez), Andy decides to join Vendetta to rescue Romulo at the hospital once again followed by her brother Peng, her mother Becky and the hostesses. At the hospital, Romulo was visited by the president of the Philippines, Oscar Hidalgo (Rowell Santiago) who wants to know some answers about Hipolito's corruption which Romulo tells him everything it happened and he begins to fed up his government rule much to his surprise. When the doctors informs Lucas, Brandon and Catherine that Marco is fine after the car accident as they argue because of Marco wanted to have a wedding with Alyana despite she was not annulled. Lucas and Brandon wanted to stop Marco's wedding as Lucas finds another way to stop this madness by making a file from the director of internal relations to put his wife enter the convention.

Andy and the others successfully informs Cardo and the others in how to rescue Romulo due to being heavily guarded by the security including the authorities as they make a strategy. However, Alakdan informs Hipolito about Catindig's personal mission to take down Romulo including Vendetta as he calls Alakdan and his group are mere troublemakers.

As Alyana visits Marco at the hospital, he was happy and more focus to be with her. However, he angrily throws a fit when his doctor informed him that his therapy is over as Alyana witnesses his violent behavior.

When they are about to take their strategy to rescue Romulo, it was disrupted by Catindig and his men attacking every innocent lives including the authorities at the hospital to kill Romulo. Knowing that Andy is in danger, Vendetta is forced to attack Catindig's group to rescue them. Vendetta takes down most of Catindig's men as Cardo infiltrates to rescue Romulo and Andy from Catindig and his men who makes a total wipe out inside the hospital. They succeeded in their mission & killed Catindig but the PNP tried to catch Cardo & his friends as well, but to no avail, since they escaped. Hipolito tries to call Catindig, not knowing that he died.

While Marco is recovering at the hospital, Alyana received the annulment papers sent by him as he called her in a happy manner. Her mother was happy about Marco being with her daughter but Alyana is unsure to sign the annulment papers after knowing of his violent behavior. Therefore, his half-brother Brandon became involved in weapons smuggling in which he had found out that Alakdan remains in contact with Hipolito while he got paid for the smuggled firearms.

Hipolito is forced to use Alakdan and his group since his right-hand man Catindig and his group were killed by Cardo and his vigilante group as Alakdan's group serve as his back-up.

When General Borja sent two of Cardo's former comrades to search about Vendetta's hideout, the neighbors became suspicious to their appearance only to warn Becky about their real presence as policemen. She tells Cardo that she and the others will deal with them. After succeeding in distracting the two disguised policemen, Vendetta manages to take Andy to the hospital safety.

Meanwhile, Lucas and Brandon are secretly planning to take down Hipolito after exposing he was responsible for letting Catindig and his men makes a total wipe out at the hospital before being killed by Cardo and his vigilante group. After the battle between the two political campaigns of both Oscar and Lucas, he and Brandon personally meets Hipolito knowing he is one of Lucas' party members in his campaign. Despite his plan to expose Hipolito's corruption during their personal meeting, Hipolito finally explains his reasons why he became the member of Pulang Araw in his youth along with his rival Romulo whom he helps him in his severely wounded state. He was later sent in Manila to study politics while Romulo became the leader of Pulang Araw and this is how he was in the present where he brings down the rebel group successfully as a Defense Secretary until he resigns to run for senator while continuing his plans to bring down his rival Romulo, who is now leading the vigilante group Vendetta.

After hearing of Hipolito's story, Lucas decided to support Hipolito's ambition to become a senator since he and Brandon are responsible for selling smuggled weapons to them.

At some point, Alyana compares between both Cardo and Marco when they started their relationship to her. Later on, she was in charge on taking care of Marco by Catherine while she was away in New York despite being hesitant to do it along with Menchu.

By the time Andy works at the hospital and to get home safely, General Borja secretly follows her as he discovers Vendetta's hideout knowing that Andy was trying to assist the vigilante group as Andy also warns Cardo about his granduncle.

Lucas, Brandon, and Hipolito begin their reign of ascension by threatening most of Oscar's party members including other innocent people by using their lies and Alakdan's group to pose as from Oscar's campaign to make death threats to vote Hipolito as senator. Their plans are later found by one of the members of Vendetta as Cardo vows to expose their corruption after rescuing several teachers from some members of Brandon's group. Meanwhile, Oscar watches the video about the teachers being rescued by Vendetta and to his surprise that the vigilante group is actually the ones who rescue countless people instead of causing more casualties.

Vendetta succeeds for the second time in rescuing all of the people including Wally (PJ Endrinal) posing as call center agents from Brandon's group and was watched by most people including the President. During their victory celebration, Cardo misses his family and was given some wise advice by Ramil. Then, Becky invited the group to meet Brother Lorenzo Alano (Rey "PJ" Abellana), the senior pastor of Liwanag ng Banal, an evangelical church that Andy and her family worship at. Brother Lorenzo, however, is Lucas, Brandon and Hipolito's next target.

By the time Vendetta rescue many people pose as call center agents and kill the headmaster, who also abduct some teachers who will be observers, seen in the news, Marco became extremely jealous. He lashes out at Alyana, thinking that she still loves Cardo; his violent behavior is caught by her parents. Alyana's father Teddy angrily scolds Marco for badly mistreating Alyana and he angrily threatens him that even if he is his daughter's boyfriend or his daughter's upcoming fiancé, he will never let him owned his daughter. This threat causes Marco to formally apologize to Alyana who is now horrified and afraid from his violent behavior.

Brother Lorenzo is then encountered by Alakdan's group as Alakdan forces him and his church to vote for both Lucas and Hipolito and threatens to kill him and his family. When Lorenzo finally announces to everyone from the church not to vote for both Lucas and Hipolito, he was later ambushed and kidnapped by Alakdan's group at the parking lot without Hipolito's knowledge as other members of his church organization (excluding Peng) are killed in a rain of bullets. Lorenzo was being held captive at Brandon's house, where Brandon physically roughs him up because of his announcement and was kept inside so that his father Lucas will cover up their misdeeds. Their success was short-lived, however; during the campaign party prepared by Lucas at the bar, Brandon takes Andy to his home while in a drunken state after meeting her in the party. Seeing Brandon's true nature like his half-brother Marco, he attempts to rape Andy, prompting Vendetta to infiltrate his home while dispersing most of his men. Andy manages to knock Brandon out as she escapes and also encounters Lorenzo in the other room where he was being held captive who recognizes her as her nickname "Andeng". Andy frees Lorenzo and both continued to escape until Brandon angrily confronts them. Without warning, Cardo shoots Brandon before he could kill both Andy and Lorenzo and they regroup. Andy explains to Lorenzo that Cardo's group are a good people and they finally escaped but their conversations are overheard by Brandon after being shot by Cardo.

After rescuing Lorenzo and he told the media about the truth behind his kidnapping, Lucas immediately arrives at Brandon's house to see Brandon who is now on a stretcher, unconscious while being taken inside the ambulance. Lucas made a press conference, claiming that Vendetta was responsible from attempting to kill Brandon and he made a bounty of 5 million pesos on the vigilante group's heads. Therefore, his wife Catherine returns to the Philippines after visiting the convention and was bombarded by questions from the various media about both her husband and her step-son's involvement in the kidnapping as she angrily confronted Lucas stating that they caused to ruin their family reputation in a scandal and he became reluctant towards his wife to fix their problems.

When General Borja and two others from the CIDG visit Lorenzo at his office as he told them the whole truth of his kidnapping and informing them that Lucas' words during the press conference are full of lies as he decided with his lawyer to file a case of kidnapping and frustrated murder against Brandon, leading to Brandon's imprisonment.

Despite Menchu's warning about Marco's violent behavior, Catherine wants to bring Alyana back as she visits on her home to apologize for her son's actions and claiming that the news are all lies. However, when Marco visits at Alyana's house to fix his relationship to Alyana, it was blocked away by her father Teddy who informs him to leave. Teddy easily noticed about both Marco's father and his half-brother's involvement in the kidnapping of Brother Lorenzo as Marco became very defensive towards his family claiming that the news about both his father and his half-brother's involvement of Lorenzo's kidnapping was a lie and the reason why he was prevented from gaining entry to her house. Teddy tells him that there's nothing wrong in Alyana's decision and his family's involvement in the kidnapping and don't try to dictate his daughter's decisions as his obsessive actions also caused his daughter to be pushed away in a distance.

As the elections are getting near, Vendetta became ready and prepared to expose all of Brandon, Lucas and Hipolito's corruption within their political campaign. To their discovery, the special assistant to the President William Celerio (Bobby Andrews) is secretly working with Lucas and Hipolito as their motive is to make Hipolito win in the elections by cheating.

Lucas and Hipolito has a meeting with William and informing them that it will be their chance to make Hipolito win the elections.

Later, William successfully steals Oscar's USB within the safe box undetected from Oscar and his other cabinets after deciphering Oscar's pass code from the safe box by observing him. He later calls his personal hacker to do his job. William led the ambush and murder of the election officers and soldiers then takes the trucks carrying the voting machines to a secret warehouse to tamper the voting machines and afterwards, he killed his personal hacker to prevent any evidence that will point to him. Vendetta then successfully blocked the trucks along with Celerio's men and caused a shootout before the tampered voting machines can be delivered to the precincts, killing all of them and some policemen. Oscar then knew of the incident and postponed the election to investigate the tampered voting machines, not knowing that William stole his USB containing the pass code. When the elections came, which became peaceful and marking the success of Vendetta's mission, Hipolito became angered for losing in the elections when he was in the last place, as well as Lucas' political group. Lucas wanted to wipe out Vendetta for interfering in their plans. Hipolito angrily calls Alakdan to get rid of Vendetta which he evilly agreed, unaware that Alakdan and his group would be paid from Lucas instead of him. Meanwhile, Oscar discovers the massacres during the elections after General Borja sent it to him. Realizing that it was William who massacred these people.

During the victory celebration, Romulo allows Cardo to fix his family relationship including Alyana as Ramil gives him an advice to fight his love for her. Cardo later reunites with his grandmother Lola Flora inside the church and informs him about Alyana's relationship with Marco and showing the annulment papers to him. Cardo refuses to sign the annulment papers and he continued to keep an eye on Alyana from afar when Marco gives her a bouquet of flowers. After Marco successfully proposed to Alyana, Cardo then kidnaps her while she was in the comfort room unbeknownst to Marco, and takes her into his former buddy in SAF in the North, Caloy Mendoza (Joven Olvido). When Marco heard of this, he, with his yandere instincts, hunts both Cardo and Alyana with his personal guard.

Meanwhile, Vendetta was in hot water again, this time for killing William Celerio while they were investigating him. And Lucas used this opportunity to get closer to Oscar and plans to get rid of him. While CIDG investigates further, the team was spying upon Andy and her mother. Konsehala Gina was successful in defaming Lola Flora with her karinderya and used her power to not only evict them on the house, but instill fear of Vendetta attacks upon gullible villagers, all while still retaining their illegal operations with her henchmen (Zaito and Shernan). Lola Flora then moves to a house owned by Kapitana Dindi, Gina's successor. They started their karinderya anew.

In the North, Cardo tries to woo Alyana into remarrying him again. At first, Alyana was very hesitant due to his previous shortcomings to her but eventually opens her heart for him once again and then severs her ties with Marco by throwing his engagement ring into the river. Cardo then serenades her with the help from his friends, and successfully proposes to her again afterwards. The next day, they were married once again. 

After their remarriage, Cardo was personally confronted by Tanggol (Joross Gamboa) the leader of the bandits after he took him down during the festival where he aggressively wants to dance with Alyana. He successfully beats Cardo into a pulp knowing he's not fighting back and as part of his revenge for taking him down. After Cardo recovers from his injuries, he decided to take Alyana back to Manila only to be observed by another group of bandits led by Tanggol's older brother Baldo (Rommel Padilla), who wanted to know about Cardo and what province he had come from and informs Tanggol and his group about his observations.

Back in Manila, Cardo and Alyana went to their families to say their goodbyes as they have decided to stay in the province of Sto. Niño for the rest of their lives. While at Alyana's house, Teddy and Virgie disagreed at first at their decision but eventually accepted. After saying goodbye to Alyana's family, they were unexpectedly seen by Marco, who starts chasing them, but they successfully escaped from his clutches. Marco then went to Alyana's house again, accusing both Teddy and JP for hiding Alyana from him, and when they tried to escape from him, Marco shoots at them, to the surprise of some customers in a karinderya, but they successfully evaded him which eventually led to Marco's investigation by the police. 

Both Cardo and Alyana finally get through to the Vendetta hideout in Legarda to see his comrades and to meet his wife as well as she meets Andy for the first time. Unbeknownst to them, an asset was sent by the PNP to the hideout to investigate and confirm if they were there. After the asset confirmed that it was Vendetta's hideout, Oscar then sent both the PNP and CIDG there to wipe Vendetta out. At the same time, Hipolito then orders Alakdan to go to the hideout as well, after Terante ratted the operation. Marco, on the other hand, also planned to go there, against his parents' orders, to kill Cardo and reclaim Alyana after his mother told him where Cardo was.

As Cardo wanted to say goodbye to his comrades, the PNP and CIDG arrive as well as Alakdan's group on both sides to infiltrate their hideout. However, Alakdan's girlfriend, Bubbles (Bianca Manalo) immediately escaped from his clutches to meet up with Becky and the others on the Vendetta hideout as she warns them about Alakdan and his group causing Andy to warn Cardo and the others about their presence including the authorities. During the infiltration, Both Cardo and Romulo's group made their separate sides to kill most of Alakdan's group (excluding the authorities). As soon as they escape from Alakdan and his other hitmen, Cardo urges his wife Alyana to go with Becky and the others to escape while he and the others return to help Romulo. During the gunfight, Happy (Anghel Marcial) is critically shot multiple times by Alakdan, but one of his men was killed too. Cardo allows Wangbu (Jobert Austria) to escape along with his wounded comrade. Cardo then ambushes Alakdan long enough to cause them into a dangerous brawl. Alakdan overpowers Cardo in a brawl and attempts to kill him by stabbing him with a knife but Cardo blocks him and finally stabs him in a stomach with a broken bottle, putting him unconscious. Cardo slowly walks away, finally avenged the deaths of the innocent victims including his son, Ricky Boy, from the explosions caused by Alakdan and his group as he encounters both Jerome and Rigor who were injured in the gun fight and took them as they flee. By the time Vendetta escaped from their hideout from the authorities, Alakdan survives his wounds sustained from the broken bottle stabbed by Cardo and was calling for help. During the escape from the authorities, Marco and his private army suddenly arrived, causing a shootout once again. Greco (Sancho delas Alas) and Butete (Smugglaz) were wounded, Happy dies from blood loss due to his multiple gunshot wounds and Barakuda (Benzon Dalina) is killed by Marco and his grenade launcher taken from him. Cardo and his group avenged their deaths by killing some of Marco's remaining men as Ramil and the others get to their vehicles to make their escape. During the car chase, Marco and his group shoots Cardo and his group but was avoided. Cardo finally had enough of Marco's murderous behavior for attacking them, he and his group stop their car as they dropped off to shoot their cars and successfully killed Marco and his group in a rain of bullets before Anton shoots both of their cars in explosion, avenging Barakuda's death.

At the hospital, the female doctor informed both Lucas and Catherine that Marco was declared dead on arrival due to blood loss sustained from his multiple gunshot wounds and Catherine couldn't accept that her son was dead as Lucas hugged his wife, mourning over his son's death, her mind broken. 
 
After taking down Marco and his group, Cardo and his group are now taking refuge on Wangbu's house where they meet Wangbu's family as Lolo Efren (Robert Arevalo) allows them to stay. At the time of Marco's wake, Lucas swore revenge against Vendetta for murdering his son and he secretly orders Alakdan's men to massacre both of Cardo and Alyana's family while Brandon was willing to escape in prison to take revenge on Marco's death. Despite Catherine's mourning over her son's loss and not listening to General Borja's word, she was still unaware of her son's investigation of the authorities when he almost shot both Teddy and JP before being killed by Cardo and his group during the car chase.

After Marco finally laid to rest, Lucas' direct order is on-going as planned and Alakdan's group were tasked by Hipolito to capture Alyana's mother Virgie (Shamaine Centenera-Buencamino) to find information on Vendetta's whereabouts which they succeed in capturing her but their plans were discovered by both Teddy and JP. As the group failed to interrogate Virgie to find Vendetta's whereabouts, they were scolded by Hipolito while Alakdan decides to go with his group as they were ordered to attack Cardo's family next. Therefore, at Wangbu's house, Jerome and Rigor are confronted by Ramil after he was contacted by General Borja about their whereabouts but also had their commotion during their dinner night with Wangbu's family. Bubbles finally tells Jerome, Rigor and Alyana about Alakdan's involvement with both Lucas and Hipolito as well as informing Cardo about their alliance.

Meanwhile, Alakdan's group attempted to threaten Lola Flora and the others when they enter their house, but was backfired due to one of the police officers interrupts one of their men who acts as lookout, causing an intense gunfight until the arrival of General Borja and the others to open fire on Alakdan and his group, who quickly escaped. He successfully rescued his older sister and the others. After Jerome informs General Borja about Cardo's plan, Cardo was angered because he thought that Jerome and Rigor are going to betray them, until he changes his mind after being convinced by him. Cardo then sets out a plan to kidnap Oscar.

As Lucas allows Catherine to return to United States to subside her grief over Marco's death and Oscar refuses to give Brandon a pardon after he was guilty for his crimes during the court trial, he plans to kill Oscar to become the president of the Philippines by using General Alejandro Terante's (Soliman Cruz) private army to assassinate him in exchange of protecting Terante's illegal activities, but Hipolito didn't like his plan and has a hidden agenda against him.

Their assassination plot are soon found by Oscar's bodyguard, Harold Casilag (Jolo Revilla) after Oscar's presidential speech at a homecoming at Camilo de Santiago University, where they graduated, knowing it was a threat, he took Oscar and his family to safety as the sniper shoots the innocent civilians creating a commotion. 

Casilag tells them to stay safe until Lucas informs them to leave the area and to blame Vendetta for causing the chaos. But Oscar was still unaware that Lucas was behind for assassinating him. Meanwhile, Casilag confronts the sniper and after a brief fight, he successfully shoots the sniper. As Oscar and his family escaped, they were cornered by several gunmen but they were killed by Casilag who arrived in time to protect Oscar and his family. Unfortunately, Casilag was gunned down and killed by the gunman posed as a civilian when he protects Oscar from getting shot before he kills it. He allows Oscar and his family to escape before dying until Lucas arrives the scene. As Terante's first plan had backfired, Terante informs Lucas about the second plan which is to ambush Oscar and his family during the escape as Vendetta follows their route and they came in time to stop Terante's second plan when they are about to ambush Oscar and his family. During the gunfight between Vendetta and Terante's men, Oscar's car were initially thrown by a smoke grenade, forcing Oscar and his family to move to the other car in order to escape from being smoked and to avoid suffocation. However, Oscar's children Yohan (Francis Magundayao) was gunned down by one of Terante's gunmen while Mary Grace (Nayomi "Heart" Ramos) was also shot from a stray bullet causing Marissa and Aubrey (Ryza Cenon) to be devastated and to Oscar's horror. While being on pursuit, Cardo follows to rescue them by riding a motocycle and to take down Terante's remaining men. At the third phase of Terante's plan, they succeeded in shooting Oscar, Aubrey, Marissa and their driver before Cardo kills them out. He then discovers Oscar was still breathing as he took him away in a bloody state to regroup with Vendetta leaving his family behind who finally taken to the ambulance to the nearby hospital for treatment but both Yohan and Mary Grace are declared dead on arrival while both Marissa and Aubrey are in critical state.

After Lucas scolds Terante for his failures and not following on his deal, Terante kills one of his cohorts by burning him alive inside the drum and using his burned corpse to pose as Oscar's corpse to make Lucas become the acting president of the Philippines as Hipolito begins to oppose Lucas after he had thought about more of his plans to kill Oscar's remaining family.

Back at Wangbu's house, Cardo and his group returned and takes the injured Oscar inside their home to be treated by Niko (Ced Torrecarion) despite that he's not a doctor or a surgeon but as a veterinarian and was assisted by Olegario to help him remove the bullet in Oscar's right chest as Cardo and his group observe them. After removing Oscar's bullet and his fever, Niko informs Cardo and his group about the good news on Oscar's recovery. At the hospital, Oscar's wife Marissa finally succumbs to her wounds after a number of flashbacks happened to her and the aftermath of the ambush while Aubrey was in a comatose state until her right hand was moving indicating her survival of the ambush. Lucas now the acting president of the Philippines promotes Terante as the PNP Chief with the rank of four-star general to make direct orders to stop Vendetta as Hipolito dislikes his plan after both are staring each other at Yohan and Mary Grace's funeral. Oscar finally awakens after recovering from his injuries and meets Cardo and the group and he recognizes Olegario. Olegario informs them that his family were killed causing him to be devastated and blames them for their deaths even if it kills him until Lucas made an announcement about Marissa's death and his daughter Aubrey who was in comatose, making him more devastated. Cardo and Jerome restrain an enraged Oscar while blaming them for their deaths not knowing that Lucas was behind the ambush for killing his family. After calming Oscar for the incident, Cardo realized during their discussion that Lucas convinced most people around Metro Manila including Oscar that their group were the ones behind the ambush as Lucas was really the one behind it, not them. As Lucas takes the oath as the President of the Philippines, he appoints Hipolito as DENR secretary while Terante as the PNP chief. Despite the betrayal made by Lucas for replacing him as Philippine President, Oscar still didn't believe that Vendetta is not an enemy and wants to escape from them even he rudely tells Alyana about Cardo and his group being criminals in the state. 

Prior to Lucas' oath taking, it was revealed that Wangbu's cousin Patrick (CJ Ramos) is a drug pusher who sells sachets of shabu to his neighboring friends for money and the reason why his sister Marie (Sue Ramirez) dresses up like a rich woman until the authorities caught them. Patrick shoots the police dead using Wangbu's gun, that he took while Wangbu was asleep, before he and the others fled after one of his friends was shot in the leg and he felt guilty after shooting the police. However, Rosa (Mystica), who is the drug supplier who distributes shabu like Patrick and frequently abuse her children due to her greed for money, angrily refused to gain entry at her home after Patrick reveals to her that he had killed the police while they were after by them.

At the Malacanang, Lucas informs Terante and Hipolito to deal against Vendetta as well as both Oscar and Aubrey as he considered her being dead despite her current condition. As soon as Oscar wants to escape from Vendetta by convincing both Jerome and Rigor, they refuse and it was revealed that Oscar is unable to listen to the vigilante group's explanations about the whole truth while he was targeted by Lucas in his recent administration after he made an ambush to kill him and his family. But after Jerome and Rigor inform General Borja about Oscar, he flees the scene and both immediately informs Cardo about his escape causing him and his group to chase him until they cornered him through the river. After the chase, they manage to take Oscar back to Wangbu's house and he angrily calls them as the enemy of the state for killing innocent people but Cardo angrily berates him that they kill people involve in corruption which prompts Romulo to let his men guard him and they realize that stop him from escaping was risky. Despite to guard Oscar, he manages to disarm Wangbu before he could bound him by the ropes and takes him as his hostage by gunpointing them with his handgun which provokes Cardo for his enraged actions to escape from them. Despite the commotion between them, Cardo allows Oscar to escape much to everyone's disappointment. Cardo's reasons to allow Oscar to escape is to let him know who his real enemy is and also prays for his safety as Alyana calmly tells him to rescue him knowing he was in danger which he agreed.

As General Borja keeps his position but is under Terante's command, he was ridiculed by Oscar's supporters due to his relation to Cardo and his vigilante group especially his older sister Lola Flora after both Yolly and Wally were nearly attacked by townspeople due to manipulation. As Oscar arrived at the church where the remains of his wife Marissa and his two children Yohan and Mary Grace are kept during the wake, he sneaks through the back of the church as he saw their caskets. Therefore, he accidentally discovers that Lucas directly orders Terante to kill him during their discussion with Hipolito after he mentions him along with Vendetta. Oscar now learns that it was really Lucas who killed his family in the ambush and not Vendetta, and he cannot forgive him for killing his family. As Oscar leaves, Lucas immediately followed suit as both saw each other eye to eye as he escaped causing him to order Terante and his men to kill him. Oscar was chased by several policemen knowing he was in danger and he now thinks who side he was on until he was rescued by Cardo and his group while they wipe out Terante's men and all policemen in a rain of bullets before leaving the premises, while Cardo picks Hidalgo like a cat. Oscar finally apologizes to Cardo for doubting them as enemies and for his rash behavior which Cardo gladly accepts and reassures him that he was alive.

Meanwhile, Lola Flora confronted the townspeople who forced to evict them on their home and it was revealed that it was Konsehala Gina who was behind the manipulations of the townspeople because of her relationship to Cardo and Vendetta and also responsible for previously evicting them. She soon called Teddy about their current situation that they moved several blocks away on Borja's own unused house. 

Failing to kill Oscar, Lucas became disappointed to Terante's failures as Terante had an intense argument with Hipolito. He directly orders Terante to kill Oscar followed by Cardo and his group. After Vendetta rescued Aubrey from their ambush plot and being reunited with her father, Lucas angrily scolds Terante for his second failure. Terante now became the PNP chief after being promoted by Lucas during the inauguration as he vows to take down Vendetta. After his promotion, He also put a bounty on both Jerome and Rigor due to both being take part in Cardo's group as well as arresting General Borja for having an alignment to his grandson Cardo, leading to his interrogation of the Vendetta's whereabouts.

Meanwhile, Gina and her cohorts manage to destroy Lola Flora's eatery due to her alignment with Cardo and Vendetta and Lola Flora became stressful for what they have done. At Wangbu's house, Cardo and Oscar decided to clean up the corruption within the Philippine Government.

Cast and characters 

Main cast
 Coco Martin as SPO2 Ricardo "Cardo" Dalisay
 Edu Manzano as President Lucas Cabrera
 Jaime Fábregas as P/Dir. Delfin S. Borja
 Angel Aquino as BGen. Diana T. Olegario
 John Arcilla as Director Renato "Buwitre" Hipolito
 Rowell Santiago as Oscar Hidalgo
 Jolo Revilla as PSG Commander Harold Casilag
 Jhong Hilario as Homer "Alakdan" Adlawan
 John Prats as SPO3 Jerome Girona, Jr.
 Sid Lucero as Maj. Manolo "Nolo" Cantindig
 Mark Anthony Fernandez as Congressman Brandon Cabrera
 Bobby Andrews as Special Assistant to the President William Celerio
 Mitch Valdes as Konsehala Gina Magtanggol
 Yassi Pressman as Alyana R. Arevalo-Dalisay
 J. C. Santos as Marco Cabrera
 Ryza Cenon as Aubrey Hidalgo
 Francis Magundayao as Yohan Hidalgo
 Dawn Zulueta as First Lady Marissa Hidalgo
 Alice Dixson as Second Lady Catherine Cabrera
 Susan Roces as Flora "Lola Kap" S. Borja-de Leon 
 Eddie Garcia as Don Emilio Syquia
 Lito Lapid as Romulo "Leon" Dumaguit

Recurring cast
 Malou Crisologo as Yolanda "Yolly" Capuyao-Santos
 Marvin Yap as Elmo Santos
 Long Mejia as Francisco "Paco" Alvarado
 John Medina as PS/Insp. Avel "Billy" M. Guzman
 Lester Llansang as PS/Insp. Mark Vargas
 Michael Roy Jornales as PS/Insp. Francisco "Chikoy" Rivera
 Marc Solis as SPO1 Rigor Soriano
 Benj Manalo as Felipe "Pinggoy" Tanyag, Jr.
 PJ Endrinal as Wally Nieves
 Pedro “Zaito” Canon, Jr. as Nick
 Roy "Shernan" Gaite as Gido
 Jay Gonzaga as James Cordero
 Arlene Tolibas as Marikit Flores
 McNeal "Awra" Briguela as Macario "Makmak" Samonte, Jr.
 James "Paquito" Sagarino as Paquito Alvarado
 Rhian "Dang" Ramos as Amanda “Dang” Ignacio
 Shantel Crislyn Layh "Ligaya" Ngujo as Ligaya Dungalo
 Enzo Pelojero as Dexter Flores
 Nayomi “Heart” Ramos as Mary Grace Hidalgo
 Joel Torre as Teodoro "Teddy" Arevalo
 Shamaine Centenera-Buencamino as Virginia "Virgie" R. Arevalo
 McCoy de Leon as Juan Pablo "JP" R. Arevalo

Guest cast

Episodes

Notes

References

External links

2018 Philippine television seasons